Urh may refer to:

Urh, Slovenska Bistrica, a settlement in Slovenska Bistrica, Slovenia
Borut Urh (born 1974), Slovenian tennis player
Urh Kastelic (born 1996), Slovenian handball player

See also
Primož Urh-Zupan (born 1983), Slovenian ski jumper
URH, the former name of JamRadio, Hull University Union's student campus radio station